During the 1959–60 season Juventus Football Club competed in Serie A, the Coppa Italia and the Friendship Cup.

Summary 
Juventus Football Club won the domestic title with a 7 points gap from runners-up Fiorentina, including a record of 92 goals scored.

The Double came along clinching the Coppa Italia. The match was played on 18 September 1960 between Juventus and Fiorentina. Juventus won 3–2; it was their fourth victory.

Squad 

(Captain)

Competitions

Serie A

League table

Matches

Coppa Italia

Eightfinals

Quarterfinals

Semifinals

Final

Statistics

Goalscorers 
 

32 goals
  Omar Sívori

29 goals
 John Charles

11 goals
 Bruno Nicolè

9 goals
 Gino Stacchini

8 goals
 Sergio Cervato

7 goals
 Giampiero Boniperti

5 goals
 Umberto Colombo

3 goals
 Severino Lojodice

2 goals
 Gianfranco Leoncini
 Giorgio Stivanello

References

External links 
 http://www.calcio.com/tutte_le_partite/ita-serie-a-1959-1960/

See also
 l'Unità, 1959 and 1960.
 La Stampa, 1959 and 1960.

Juventus F.C. seasons
Juventus
Italian football championship-winning seasons